Ustani Jee is a Pakistani anthology thriller drama series, directed and produced by Angeline Malik and Written by Yasra Rizvi. Each episode of drama consists of a different cast except Yasra Rizvi, Hammad Farooqui and Ghana Ali who are regular characters. The drama aired weekly episodes on Hum TV every Saturday.

Plot
A series highlighting the problems of particular society from the perspective of Ustani Jee who is psychologist professor and lived alone in that society. In each episode she solve cases of society members who are being suffered from social and domestic issues.

Cast 

Note:  Names are listed in Episodic order followed by their appearances
Yasra Rizvi as Ustani Jee née Shehwar
Ghana Ali as Abeera
Hammad Farooqui as Ahsan
Kamran Jilani as Shehwar's ex-fiancée
Minal Khan as Salma (Episode 1)
Alyy Khan as Noman (Episode 1)
Mariam Mirza as Noman's wife (Episode 1)
Mehmood Akhtar as Salma's father (Episode 1)
Saman Ansari as Sobia (Ep. 2)
Saleem Mairaj as Amjad (Ep. 2)
Samina Ahmad as Zubaida Khala (Ep. 3)
Imran Ashraf as Anwar (Ep. 3)
Sana Askari as Mariam; Anwar's wife (Ep. 3)
Uzma Hassan as Soniya (Ep. 4)
Hassan Ahmed as Aslam; Soniya's husband (Ep. 4)
Fouzia Mushtaq as Soniya's mother (Ep. 4)
Lubna Aslam as Aslam's mother (Ep. 4)
Qavi Khan as Shehwar's father (Ep. 5)
Ismat Zaidi as Shehwar's mother (Ep. 5)
Aijaz Aslam as Zubair (Ep. 6)
Farah Shah as Shaista (Ep. 6)
Zarnish Khan as Zara (Ep. 7)
Mehmood Aslam as Abdul Karim:  Zara's father (Ep. 7)
Usama Khan as Zara's fiancé (Ep. 7)
Ramsha Khan as Kiran Khan (Ep.  8)
Rubina Ashraf as Kiran's mother (Ep.  8)
Sarah Khan as Zainab (Ep. 9)
Agha Ali as Aamir (Ep. 9)
Ambar Wajid as Aamir's mother (Ep. 9)
Hina Altaf as Sidra (Ep. 10)
Fazila Kaiser as Sidra's mother (Ep. 10)
Rehan Sheikh as Sidra's father (Ep. 10)
Malik Hamza as Landlord (Ep.  11)
Rashid Farooqui as Altaf (Ep. 12)
Amar Khan as Sanober (Ep. 12, 13)
Noor Khan as Mahnoor (Ep. 13,14)
Sara Razi as Mahpara (Ep. 14)
Maria Wasti as Rukhsar (Ep.  15)
Saife Hassan as Rukhsar's husband (Ep. 15)
Taqi Ahmed as Rukhsar's boss

See also 
 List of programs broadcast by Hum TV

References

External links 
 Official Website

Hum TV original programming
2018 Pakistani television series debuts
Pakistani television series
2010s anthology television series
Urdu-language television shows
Pakistani anthology television series